These are the official results of the Women's Individual Road Race at the 1992 Summer Olympics in Barcelona, Spain. The race over 81 kilometres was held on July 26, 1992. There were a total number of 58 competitors, with one non-starter.

Final classification

References

External links
 Official Report

W
Oly
Cycling at the Summer Olympics – Women's road race
1992 in women's road cycling
Cyc